Enenteridae is a family of trematodes belonging to the order Plagiorchiida.

Genera:
 Enenterageitus Huston, Cutmore & Cribb, 2019
 Enenterum Linton, 1910
 Koseiria Nagaty, 1942
 Neoenenterum Bilqees & Khatoon, 2004
 Proenenterum Manter, 1954
 Pseudozakia Machida & Araki, 1977

References

Plagiorchiida